Ceratocystiopsis is a genus of ascomycete fungi in the family Ophiostomataceae, which infect bark.

References

External links

Ophiostomatales
Sordariomycetes genera